Budai Township is an urban township in Chiayi County, Taiwan.

History
Formerly known as Po-te-chhui, it was the site where Japanese forces landed and completed the encirclement of Tainan during the Japanese invasion in 1895.

Administrative divisions
The township comprises 23 villages: Caipu, Cenhai, Daijiang, Fuxing, Guangfu, Guishe, HaomeiJiangshan, Jianlong, Jiulong, Kaoshi, Longjiang, Shulin, Tungan, Tunggang, Xian, Xincen, Xincuo, Xingzhong, Xinmin, Yongan, Zhenliao, and Zhongan.

Economy
Its industry is mainly made up of fishery.

Tourist attractions
 Haomeiliao Wetland
 High-Heel Wedding Church

Transportation
 Budai Harbor

Notable natives
 Chai Trong-rong, member of Legislative Yuan (1993–1996, 1997–2012)

References

Townships in Chiayi County